Piero Livi (1 April 1925 – 2 September 2015) was an Italian director and screenwriter.

Career
Born in Olbia, Livi was among the founders of a film society in his hometown, and was organizer and artistic director of eighteen editions of the International Festival of Olbia, from 1957 to 1974. He started his career in 1957, with the short film Marco dal mare. He made his feature film debut in 1969, with the neorealistic drama Pelle di bandito, loosely based on real life events of the Sardinian bandit Graziano Mesina, which was screened out of competition at the 31st Venice International Film Festival. He was also a director of dubbing.

Filmography 
 
     Marco del mare (short film, 1957)
     Visitazione (short film, 1958)
     Il faro (short film, 1961)
     Una storia sarda (medium length film, 1962)
     I 60 di Berchiddeddu (short film, 1965), co-directed with Aldo Serio
     Il cerchio del silenzio (short film, 1966), co-directed with Aldo Serio
     Pelle di bandito (1969)
     Dove volano i corvi d'argento (1976)
     Sos laribiancos - I dimenticati (2001)
     Maria sì (2005)

References

External links
 

1925 births
2015 deaths
20th-century Italian people
Italian film directors
Italian screenwriters
Italian male screenwriters
People from Olbia
Deaths from cancer in Lazio